"El Negro" is a common Spanish language nickname, meaning "The Black".

People 

 Estevanico (1500–1539), African explorer of the New World
 Fernando "El Negro" Chamorro (1933–1994), Nicaraguan rebel
 Arturo Durazo Moreno (1924–2000), Mexican chief of police and convicted criminal
 Roberto Fontanarrosa (1944–2007), Argentine cartoonist
 Alejandro González Iñárritu (born 1963), Mexican filmmaker
 Horacio Hernandez (born 1963), Cuban drummer
 Juan Matta-Ballesteros (born 1945), Honduran drug lord
 Jorge Pabón (194?–1988), close collaborator of Pablo Escobar
 Iván Arias (born 1958), Bolivian journalist and politician
 Martín Ramírez (cyclist) (born 1960), a Colombian cyclist

Other 
 El Negro en ik, a book by Frank Westerman, about the controversy surrounding Negro of Banyoles and Georges Cuvier

See also
 Kuro (disambiguation)
 Negro (disambiguation)